James Adam Bede (January 13, 1856 – April 11, 1942) was an American politician who served as U.S. Representative from Minnesota.

Early life and education

Bede and his twin brother were born on a farm in Eaton Township, Lorain County, Ohio. He spent his boyhood on a farm and attended the public schools of Ohio, Oberlin College, and Tabor College in Tabor, Iowa, and read law while learning the printing trade.

Career
Bede taught school in Iowa, Ohio, and Arkansas. He was editor and publisher of several newspapers and periodicals, and served as a representative for several western newspapers in Washington, D.C. In 1886, he moved to Minnesota. He was engaged in newspaper work at Pine City, Minnesota, Pine County, Minnesota; served as United States marshal for the district of Minnesota in 1894 during the great railway strike; spoke at the first annual dinner of the Associated Press in New York; elected as a Republican to the 58th, 59th, and 60th congresses, (March 4, 1903 – March 3, 1909); unsuccessful candidate for renomination in 1908 to the 61st congress; returned to Pine City; engaged as a publisher and lecturer; moved to Duluth, Minnesota, in 1927 and engaged in his former pursuits; also was interested in the St. Lawrence inland waterway project; Bede also served in the Minnesota House of Representatives, in 1931-1932, from St. Louis County, Minnesota; 
Bede was noted for his humor and speaking style. In an April 28, 1912 article titled "How humor Enlivens the Solemn Work of Congress" the New York Times reported:

Adam Bede was one of the most popular stump speakers and spellbinders of the present generation. His speeches were full of dry humor and his droll manner of illustrating his arguments by stories of the day never failed to win the applause of his audiences.

In his book The Homesteaders recounting life in early twentieth century rural Pine County Minnesota, O Bernard Johnson describes Bede's speaking style as follows:

J. Adam Bede of Pine City, was a congressman in the early 1900s. He was a great humorist and had a rapid fire delivery. When running for reelection he spoke in our schoolhouse and had the audience in stitches during his entire speech.  If he said anything seriously about the issues of the day no one can recall, but I am sure that his humor got him many votes.

Personal
Bede was married and had seven children. He died in Duluth, Minnesota, April 11, 1942 and is buried in Birchwood Cemetery, Pine City, Minnesota.

References

External links

1856 births
1942 deaths
Republican Party members of the Minnesota House of Representatives
Oberlin College alumni
La Salle Extension University alumni
United States Marshals
People from Pine City, Minnesota
People from Lorain County, Ohio
Republican Party members of the United States House of Representatives from Minnesota
American lawyers admitted to the practice of law by reading law
Tabor College (Iowa) alumni